Leon Hatziioannou (born March 28, 1965) is a former Canadian football defensive lineman who played eight seasons in the Canadian Football League with the Ottawa Rough Riders, Winnipeg Blue Bombers and Toronto Argonauts. He was drafted by the Ottawa Rough Riders in the third round of the 1988 CFL Draft. He played CIS football at Simon Fraser University.

References

External links
Just Sports Stats

Living people
1965 births
Canadian football people from Toronto
Canadian football defensive linemen
Simon Fraser Clan football players
Ottawa Rough Riders players
Winnipeg Blue Bombers players
Toronto Argonauts players